Carmel Higher Secondary School is an institution established and managed by Carmelites of Mary Immaculate fathers. It is situated in Chalakudy, near the Chalakudy railway station in India. The school has a history of near to 40 years. It was the first English medium school in Chalakudy.

School history

Carmel Higher Secondary School was established by the Carmelites of Mary Immaculate Congregation of Devamatha Province, Thrissur on 16 July 1975. The school founded by Rev. Fr. Gabriel, the Provincial of Devamatha Province. It is recognized by the Government of Kerala and the medium of instruction is English.

Current school events
The present head of the institution is Rev. Fr. Jose Kidangan. The school has 2082 pupils. Carmel does charity work for poor students in Chalakudy. Carmel is known for its academic and co curricular excellence all over Kerala.

References

External links 
 

Carmelite educational institutions
Christian schools in Kerala
High schools and secondary schools in Kerala
Schools in Thrissur district
Buildings and structures in Chalakudy
Education in Chalakudy
Educational institutions established in 1975
1975 establishments in Kerala